Yang Juan (born 5 September 1969) is a Chinese athlete. She competed in the women's long jump at the 1992 Summer Olympics.

References

1969 births
Living people
Athletes (track and field) at the 1992 Summer Olympics
Chinese female long jumpers
Olympic athletes of China
Place of birth missing (living people)